The Korea Sports Promotion Foundation (KSPO) is a government-funded independently operated company based in Songpa-gu, Seoul, South Korea. Founded in 1989 to continue the legacy of the 1988 Summer Olympics, it is run by the Ministry of Culture, Sports and Tourism.

History
The Korea Sports Promotion Foundation was founded as the Seoul Olympic Sports Promotion Foundation the year after the 1988 Summer Olympics hosted by Seoul. Its original mandate was to manage the sports facilities, which have been opened for public use, specifically built for the Olympics due to concerns raised about Olympic venues being unused and going to waste at the end of the competition. The KSPO was founded to promote the use of those facilities by the public. Since then, it has expanded to include facilitating and supporting community-based sports programs, promoting an active lifestyle to the public and funding research in athlete performance.

The company receives funding from the government and revenue earned from Sports Toto, one of the country's few legal betting services.

Sports
The KSPO sponsors two professional sports team (cycling and women's football) and athletes in the Olympic disciplines of canoeing, diving, fencing and marathon running and Paralympic skiing.
Canoeing
Cycling (KSPO Professional)
Diving
Fencing
Football (Hwacheon KSPO WFC)
Marathon running
Para-alpine skiing

Notable athletes on its roster include fencers Kim Jung-hwan and Gu Bon-gil and diver Woo Ha-ram.

Sponsored facilities
Olympic Gymnastics Arena, also known as the KSPO Dome

References

External Links
Official Website 

1988 Summer Olympics
Sport in South Korea
Companies based in Seoul